Lee Seung-bong is a South Korean freestyle wrestler. He won the silver medal in the men's 70 kg event at the 2018 Asian Wrestling Championships held in Bishkek, Kyrgyzstan.

In 2019, he represented South Korea at the Military World Games held in Wuhan, China and he won one of the bronze medals in the men's freestyle 74 kg event.

He competed in the 74kg event at the 2022 World Wrestling Championships held in Belgrade, Serbia.

Achievements

References 

Living people
Year of birth missing (living people)
Place of birth missing (living people)
South Korean male sport wrestlers
21st-century South Korean people